The 2003 Grand Prix of Monterey was the seventh round of the 2003 CART World Series season, held on June 15, 2003 at Mazda Raceway Laguna Seca in Monterey, California.

Qualifying results

*Tiago Montiero did not set a time in the first qualification session after damaging his car prior to the session.  He used his backup car in the second qualification session.
**Michel Jourdain set the fastest time in the second qualification session (1:09.530) but his time was disallowed after his car was found to be underweight during tech inspection.

Race

Caution flags

Notes

 New Race Record Patrick Carpentier 1:48:11.023
 Average Speed 107.986 mph

External links
 Full Weekend Times & Results

Monterey
Monterey Grand Prix
Grand Prix of Monterey